Shen Ye (traditional Chinese: 沈燁; simplified Chinese: 沈烨; born 11 March 1987) is a male Chinese badminton player.

Achievements

Asian Championships 
Men's doubles

Summer Universiade 
Men's doubles

World Junior Championships 
Boys' doubles

Asian Junior Championships 
Boys' doubles

Mixed doubles

BWF Superseries  
The BWF Superseries, launched on 14 December 2006 and implemented in 2007, is a series of elite badminton tournaments, sanctioned by Badminton World Federation (BWF). BWF Superseries has two level such as Superseries and Superseries Premier. A season of Superseries features twelve tournaments around the world, which introduced since 2011, with successful players invited to the Superseries Finals held at the year end.

Men's doubles

 BWF Superseries Finals tournament
 BWF Superseries Premier tournament
 BWF Superseries tournament

BWF Grand Prix 
The BWF Grand Prix has two levels: Grand Prix and Grand Prix Gold. It is a series of badminton tournaments, sanctioned by Badminton World Federation (BWF) since 2007.

Men's doubles

 BWF Grand Prix Gold tournament
 BWF Grand Prix tournament

References

External links 
 

1987 births
Living people
Sportspeople from Changzhou
Badminton players from Jiangsu
Chinese male badminton players
Universiade silver medalists for China
Universiade bronze medalists for China
Universiade medalists in badminton
Medalists at the 2007 Summer Universiade